Micrognathism is a condition where the jaw is undersized. It is also sometimes called mandibular hypoplasia. It is common in infants, but is usually self-corrected during growth, due to the jaws' increasing in size.  It may be a cause of abnormal tooth alignment and in severe cases can hamper feeding. It can also, both in adults and children, make intubation difficult, either during anesthesia or in emergency situations.

Causes

While not always pathological, it can present as a birth defect in multiple syndromes including:
 Catel–Manzke syndrome
 Bloom syndrome
 Coffin–Lowry syndrome
 Congenital rubella syndrome
 Cri du chat syndrome
 DiGeorge syndrome
 Ehlers–Danlos syndrome
 Fetal alcohol syndrome
 Hallermann–Streiff syndrome
 Hemifacial microsomia (as part of Goldenhar syndrome)
 Incontinentia pigmenti
 Juvenile idiopathic arthritis
 Loeys–Dietz syndrome
 Marfan syndrome
 Möbius syndrome
 Noonan syndrome
 Pierre Robin syndrome
 Prader–Willi syndrome
 Progeria
 Silver–Russell syndrome
 Seckel syndrome
 Smith–Lemli–Opitz syndrome
 Stickler syndrome
 Treacher Collins syndrome
 Trisomy 13 (Patau syndrome)
 Trisomy 18 (Edwards syndrome)
 Trisomy 21 (Down syndrome)
 Wolf–Hirschhorn syndrome
 X0 syndrome (Turner syndrome)

Diagnosis
It can be detected by the naked eye as well as dental or skull X-Ray testing.

Treatments
Micrognathia can be treated by surgery, orthodontic braces, and modified eating methods. Early detection of the problem and monitoring as the problems grows can help understand it better and find the most effective treatment procedure.

See also
 Human mandible
 Macrognathism
 Retrognathism

References

External links 

 

Jaw disorders